Sherlock is a crime television series that presents a contemporary adaptation of Sir Arthur Conan Doyle's Sherlock Holmes detective stories. It was created by Steven Moffat and Mark Gatiss and it stars Benedict Cumberbatch as Sherlock Holmes and Martin Freeman as Doctor John Watson. The first series of three episodes aired in 2010, while series two aired in 2012, and a third series aired in the first quarter of 2014. A single episode aired in 2016, as a Victorian-era special, followed by a fourth series in 2017.  In January 2014, Moffat confirmed that a fifth series had been plotted; however, as to the future of the series, Gatiss stated that due to the conflicting schedules of Cumberbatch and Freeman, a potential fifth season is still up in the air. The third series has become the UK's most watched drama series since 2001, and Sherlock has been sold to over 200 territories.

Sherlock depicts "consulting detective" Holmes, assisting the Metropolitan Police Service, primarily Detective Inspector Greg Lestrade (Rupert Graves), in solving various crimes. Holmes is assisted by his flatmate, Dr John Watson, who has returned from military service in Afghanistan. Although the series depicts a variety of crimes and perpetrators, Holmes' conflict with his archenemy Jim Moriarty (Andrew Scott) is a recurring feature. Molly Hooper (Louise Brealey), a pathologist at Bart's Hospital occasionally assists Holmes in his cases. Other recurring roles include Una Stubbs as Mrs Hudson, Holmes and Watson's landlady; and co-creator Mark Gatiss as Sherlock's brother, Mycroft Holmes.

Series overview

Episodes

Series 1 (2010)

Series 2 (2012)

Series 3 (2014)

Special (2016)

Series 4 (2017)

References

External links
 
 Sherlock at the BBC

BBC-related lists
Lists of British crime drama television series episodes
Lists of British mystery television series episodes

Sherlock Holmes lists